Seawise is a name associated with Chinese-Hong Kong shipping magnate Tung Chao-yung. It is a pun on his abbreviated name "C. Y. Tung."

 Seawise Giant,  a ULCC supertanker that was the longest ship ever, salvaged by Tung's OOCL in 1970
 Seawise University, a floating university conceived of by Tung which was hosted on the